Nandi (Naandi), also known as Cemual, is a Kalenjin language spoken in the highlands of western Kenya, in the districts of Nandi, Uasin Gishu and Trans-Nzoia.

Classification
Nandi is the language spoken by the Nandi, who are part of the Kalenjin people. These languages and dialects, classified with the Datooga language and the Omotik language, form the Southern Nilotic languages sub-group of the Nilotic languages.

Phonology
The tables below present the vowels and consonants of Nandi.

Vowels

Nandi differentiates its vowels according to their place of articulation. They are either pronounced with the root of the tongue advanced, or with the root of the tongue retracted.

Consonants

Tone
Nandi is a tonal language.

References

External links 
Bukuitab Saet, Portions of the Book of Common Prayer in Nandi (1962) digitized by Richard Mammana

Kalenjin languages
Languages of Kenya